The 2012 Investec London Cup was a women's field hockey tournament held at the Quintin Hogg Memorial Sports Ground. It took place between 5–9 June 2012 in Chiswick, England. A total of six teams competed for the title.

The Netherlands won the tournament by defeating Australia 4–1 in the final. Germany won the bronze medal by defeating South Africa 6–2 in the third and fourth playoff, while Great Britain finished 5th by defeating Ireland 3–0.

Teams

Results

First round

Pool A

Pool B

Second round

Fifth and Sixth place

First to fourth place classification

Semi-finals

Third and fourth place

Final

Statistics

Final standings

Goalscorers
5 Goals

 Kelly Jonker
 Maartje Paumen

3 Goals

 Emily Smith
 Janine Beermann
 Hannah MacLeod
 Pietie Coetzee 

2 Goals
 Eileen Hoffmann
1 Goal

 Fiona Boyce
 Casey Eastham
 Anna Flanagan
 Kobie McGurk
 Georgia Nanscawen
 Jodie Schulz
 Kristina Hillmann
 Natascha Keller
 Hannah Krüger
 Julia Muller
 Katharina Otte
 Maike Stockel
 Susie Gilbert
 Emily Maguire
 Nicola Daly
 Marilyn Agliotti
 Carlien Dirkse van den Heuvel
 Ellen Hoog
 Dirkie Chamberlain
 Bernadette Coston
 Sulette Damons
 Jennifer Wilson

References

External links

2012
2012 in women's field hockey
International women's field hockey competitions hosted by England
International sports competitions in London
hockey
hockey
2012 in Australian women's field hockey
hockey
hockey
hockey